The Ecuador national futsal team is controlled by the Federación Ecuatoriana de Fútbol, the governing body for futsal in Ecuador and represents the country in international futsal competitions, such as the World Cup and the Copa América.

Tournament records

FIFA Futsal World Cup
 1989 - did not enter
 1992 - did not qualify
 1996 - did not enter
 2000 - did not qualify
 2004 - did not qualify
 2008 - did not qualify
 2012 - did not qualify
 2016 - did not qualify
 2020 - did not qualify

Copa América de Futsal
 1992 – 4th place
 1995 – did not enter
 1996 – did not enter
 1997 – did not enter
 1998 – did not enter
 1999 – did not enter
 2000 – 1st round
 2003 – 8th place
 2008 – 6th place
 2011 – did not enter
 2015 – 9th place (host)
 2017 – 8th place
 2022 – 7th place

FIFA Futsal World Cup qualification (CONMEBOL)/CONMEBOL Preliminary Competition
 2012 – 10th place
 2016 – 8th place

FIFUSA/AMF Futsal World Cup
 1982 - did not enter
 1985 - did not enter
 1988 - did not enter
 1991 - did not enter
 1994 - did not enter
 1997 - did not enter
 2000 - did not enter
 2003 - 1st round
 2007 - Quarterfinals
 2011 - 1st round
 2015 - did not enter
 2019 - TBD

Grand Prix de Futsal
 2005 – did not enter
 2006 – did not enter
 2007 – did not enter
 2008 – did not enter
 2009 – 15th place
 2010 – did not enter
 2011 – did not enter
 2013 – did not enter
 2014 – did not enter
 2015 – did not enter
 2017 – TBD

Futsal at the Pan American Games
 2007 – 8th place

References

External links
 FIFA
 CONMEBOL

Ecuador
National sports teams of Ecuador
Futsal in Ecuador